Gargi Vachaknavi (Sans: गार्गी वाचक्नवी (Devanagari); Gargi Vacaknavi (HK)), was an ancient Indian sage and philosopher. In Vedic literature, she is honored as a great natural philosopher, renowned expounder of the Vedas, and known as Brahmavadini, a person with knowledge of Brahma Vidya. In the Sixth and the eighth Brahmana of Brihadaranyaka Upanishad, her name is prominent as she participates in the brahmayajna, a philosophic debate organized by King Janaka of Videha and she challenges the sage Yajnavalkya with perplexing questions on the issue of atman (soul). She is also said to have written many hymns in the Rigveda. She remained a celibate all her life and was held in veneration by the conventional Hindus.

Gargi, the daughter of sage Vachaknu in the lineage of sage Garga (c. 800-500 BCE) was named after her father as Gargi Vachaknavi. From a young age she evinced keen interest in Vedic scriptures and became very proficient in fields of philosophy. She became highly knowledgeable in the Vedas and Upanishads in the Vedic times and held intellectual debates with other philosophers.

Early life
Gargi was the daughter of sage Vachaknu in the lineage of sage Garga (c. 800-500 BCE) and hence named after her father as Gargi Vachaknavi. Right from a young age, Vachaknavi was very intellectual. She acquired knowledge of the Vedas and scriptures and became renowned for her proficiency in these fields of philosophy.

Later life
Gargi, along with Vadava Pratitheyi and Sulabha Maitreyi are among the prominent females who figure in the Upanishads. She was as knowledgeable in Vedas and Upanishads as men of the Vedic times and could very well contest the male-philosophers in debates. Her name appears in the Grihya Sutras of Asvalayana. She was a leading scholar who also made rich contributions to propagate education.

Debate with Yajnavalkya
According to Brihadaranyaka Upanishad, King Janaka of Videha Kingdom held a Rajasuya Yagna and invited all the learned sages, kings and princes of India to participate. The yagna lasted for many days. Large quantities of sandalwood, ghee (clarified butter) and barley (cereal grain) were offered to the Yagna fire creating an atmosphere of spiritual sanctity and aroma. Janaka himself being a scholar was impressed with the large gathering of learned sages. He thought of selecting a scholar from the assembled group of elite scholars, the most accomplished of them all who had maximum knowledge about Brahman. For this purpose, he evolved a plan and offered a prize of 1,000 cows with each cow dangled with 10 grams of gold on its horns. The galaxy of scholars, apart from others, included the renowned sage Yajnavalkya and Gargi Vachaknavi. Yajnavalkya, who was aware that he was the most spiritually knowledgeable among the assembled gathering, as he had mastered the art of Kundalini Yoga, ordered his disciple Samsrava to drive away the cow herd to his house. This infuriated the scholars as they felt that he was taking way the prize without contesting in a debate. Some of the local pundits (scholars) did not volunteer for debate with him as they were not sure of their knowledge. However, there were eight renowned sages who challenged him for a debate, which included Gargi, the only woman in  the assembled gathering of the learned.

Sages like Asvala, the priest in Janaka's court, Artabhaga, Bhujyu, Ushasta, and Uddalaka debated with him and asked questions philosophical subjects to which Yajnavalkya provided convincing replies and they lost the debate. It was then the turn of Gargi to take up the challenge. Gargi, as one of the disputants in the debate, questioned Yajnavalkya on his claim of superiority among the scholars. She held repeated arguments with him. Gargi and Yajnavalkya's exchange centered on the ultimate "warp" of reality ("warp" means "the basic foundation or material of a structure or entity). Her initial dialogue with Yajnavalkya tended to be too metaphysical, such as unending status of the soul, away from practical situations. She then changed her approach and asked him pointed questions related to the environment existing in the world, the question of the very origin of all existence. Her question was specific when she asked him "since this whole world is woven back and forth on water, on what then is it woven back and forth", a question that related to the commonly known cosmological metaphor that expressed the unity of the world, its essential interconnectedness. In the Brihadaranyaka Upanishad (3.6), the sequence of her posing a bevy of questions to Yajnavalkya and his replies is narrated as: 

She continued with an array of questions such as what was the universe of the suns, what were the moon, the stars, the gods, Indra, and Prajapati. Gargi then pressed on with two more questions. Gargi urged Yajnavalkya to enlighten her on the weave of reality and asked: 

Gargi was not satisfied and then posed the next question:

Then she asked a final question, on what was Brahman (world of the imperishable)? Yagnavalakya put an end to the debate by telling Gargi not to proceed further as otherwise she would lose her mental balance. This riposte put an end to their further dialogue at the conference of the learned. However, at the end of the debate she conceded to the superior knowledge of Yajnavalkya by saying: "venerable Brahmins, you may consider it a great thing if you get off bowing before him. No one, I believe, will defeat him in any argument concerning Brahman." 

Her philosophical views also find mention in the Chandogya Upanishad. Gargi, as Brahmavadini, composed several hymns in Rigveda (in X 39. V.28) that questioned the origin of all existence. The Yoga Yajnavalkya, a classical text on Yoga is a dialogue between Gargi and sage Yajnavalkya. Gargi was honoured as one of the Navaratnas (nine gems) in the court of King Janaka of Mithila.

References

Bibliography

External links
 Women Philosophers
 Gargi, The first women Philosopher

Ancient Asian women writers
Ancient Indian philosophers
Hindu philosophers and theologians
Hindu poets
Place of birth unknown
Year of birth unknown
Year of death unknown
Indian women poets
Women religious writers
Year of birth uncertain
Indian women philosophers
Women mystics
7th-century BC Hindus
7th-century BC Indian philosophers
8th-century BC Hindus
8th-century BC Indian philosophers
Upanishadic people